Canteen most often refers to:
 Canteen (bottle), a water container
 Cafeteria, a type of food service location within an institution in which there is little or no waiting staff table service
 A complete set of cutlery comprising knives, forks, and spoons, usually sufficient for several place-settings at a meal
 An archaic use was to describe a sutler's shop, where provisions were sold to the military.

Canteen may also refer to:

Places
 Canteen Township, St. Clair County, Illinois, a township in Illinois
 North Platte Canteen, a railroad stop in North Platte, Nebraska, United States that operated from 1941 to 1946

Other uses
 Canteen (magazine), an English-language literary and arts magazine
 CanTeen, the Australian and New Zealand national support organisation for young people with cancer
 Canteen, a railway tender, hauled by a steam locomotive, which holds only water
 Canteen (prison), or prison commissary, a store within a prison where inmates can buy sundries

See also
 Cantina